Exaltation is a belief among members of the Church of Jesus Christ of Latter-day Saints (LDS Church) that mankind can reach the highest level of salvation in the celestial kingdom, to eternally live in God's presence, continue as families, become gods, create worlds, and have spirit children over which they will govern. Church leaders have taught God wants exaltation for all humankind and that humans are "gods in embryo". The church teaches that through exaltation believers may become joint-heirs with Jesus Christ as stated in Romans 8:17 and Revelation 21:7. The objective of adherents is to strive for purity and righteousness and to become one with Jesus as Jesus is one with God the Father. A verse in the canonized Doctrine and Covenants states that those who are exalted will become gods, and a 1925 statement from the church's highest governing body said that "All men and women are in the similitude of the universal Father and Mother ... [and are] capable, by experience through ages and aeons, of evolving into a God." A popular Mormon quote—often attributed to the early apostle Lorenzo Snow in 1837—is "As man now is, God once was: As God now is, man may be."

Required ordinances
According to Mormonism, certain ordinances are required of all those who hope to obtain exaltation. The ordinances that are required for exaltation are called "saving ordinances". The saving ordinances are
 Baptism;
 Confirmation;
 Melchizedek priesthood ordination (for men);
 Endowment, including washing and anointing;
 Celestial marriage;
 Sealing to parents.

The endowment, celestial marriage, and sealing to parents take place in temples.

Latter-day Saints are taught that they can receive exaltation through performing saving ordinances. Performance of the saving ordinances does not guarantee exaltation. Rather, individuals must do their best to be faithful to the covenants that the ordinances represent. Between 1844 and 1977, church members of black African descent were not permitted to participate in ordinances performed in temples. Because these ordinances are considered essential to enter the highest degree of heaven, this meant black people were effectively banned from exaltation.

For those who have lived and died without having received these ordinances, it is believed that exaltation will be available through LDS Church vicarious temple work. Latter-day Saints perform the saving ordinances on each other in temples on behalf of those who are dead. Latter-day Saints believe that all individuals will have an equitable and fair opportunity to hear the "fullness of the gospel" and that those who did not have an opportunity to accept the saving ordinances in this life will subsequently have the opportunity to accept them in the spirit world.

Acceptance of the saving ordinances by those who have died is voluntary and does not take away the agency of those individuals. Should an individual who is in the spirit world subsequently reject saving ordinances performed for them, it would be as if these ordinances were never performed. It is taught that some will accept them, and others will reject them.

There is currently a less common temple ordinance which confers exaltation called the second anointing. It is the pinnacle ordinance of the temple and an extension of the Nauvoo endowment which founder Joseph Smith taught was to ensure salvation, guarantee exaltation, and confer godhood. In the ordinance, a participant is anointed as a "priest and king" or a "priestess and queen", and is sealed to the highest degree of salvation available in Mormon theology. The ordinance is currently only given in secret to a few select couples chosen by top leaders, and presently most LDS adherents are unaware of the ritual's existence.

Nature of exaltation
The LDS Church teaches that those who receive exaltation will:

 live eternally in the presence of God the Father and Jesus Christ;
 become gods;
 be united eternally with their righteous family members and will be able to have eternal offspring;
 receive a fulness of joy; and;
 be given everything that God the Father and Jesus Christ have—all power, glory, dominion, and knowledge.

The church teaches that after death exalted individuals will continue having marital sexual relations, create worlds, and have spirit children over which they will govern as gods. Recent examples of this include a 2010 church manual which states that after death exalted adherents can "develop a kingdom over which [they] will preside as its king and god." This teaching is also echoed in a 2002 church manual which says exalted people "will[...] make new worlds for [their spirit children] to live on", and a 2006 Ensign article which says if adherents are faithful and follow God's commandments they can receive, "a fulness and a continuation of the seeds forever, and perhaps through our faithfulness to have the opportunity of building worlds and peopling them."

A 2020 Sunday School manual says, "marital intimacy is glorious and will continue eternally for covenant-keeping husbands and wives." A 2013 student manual quotes a former church president who taught future exalted people can "organize matter into worlds on which their posterity may dwell, and over which they shall rule as gods."

Different kingdoms
Those who reject the ordinances are still believed to have the opportunity to inherit a kingdom of glory distinct from and of less glory than the celestial kingdom: the terrestrial kingdom or the telestial kingdom Exaltation in the celestial kingdom is the ultimate goal of faithful LDS Church members.

In an LDS scripture, the Book of Moses 1:39, God tells Moses that "this is my work and my glory—to bring to pass the immortality and eternal life of man." God shows Moses a vision depicting some of his vast creations including a vast number of worlds created for other people, a sampling of what God created in the past and what he will continue to do forever. Each world was prepared and peopled by God for the purpose of bringing to pass the immortality and eternal life of all of his children. Immortality refers to personal resurrection by which each individual can continue to enjoy a perfect, physical body forever. Exaltation refers to living in the presence of God and Jesus Christ; to becoming like God both in terms of holiness or godliness and sharing in God's glory.

It is commonly believed by members of the Church that as God's children, people may, through the merits and mercy accorded all through the Atonement of Christ, become like God the Father. As Paul taught the Romans, "And if children, then heirs; heirs of God, and joint-heirs with Christ; if so be that we suffer with him, that we may be also glorified together." Eternity will be spent in a process of eternal progression becoming more like the Father (God).

Latter-day Saints posit that God has the power to exalt mortal man and even that without the possibility, there is little reason for mortality. They also point to comments made by Christ and Psalmists among others that refer to the Divine nature and potential of humans as children of God. They include passages in the Book of Revelation that describe the joint heirship with Christ of those who overcome by faith in Jesus Christ.

See also

Apotheosis
Divinization (Christian)
God in Mormonism
King Follett discourse
Mormon cosmology
Mormonism and Nicene Christianity
Plan of salvation
Theosis (Orthodox theology)

Notes

References

Latter Day Saint concepts of the afterlife
Latter Day Saint doctrines regarding deity
Latter Day Saint terms
Immortality
Mormonism-related controversies